Tonga competed in the Olympic Games for the first time at the 1984 Summer Olympics in Los Angeles, United States.

Boxing

Men

References 
 Official Olympic Reports

Nations at the 1984 Summer Olympics
1984
1984 in Tongan sport